St George and St Mary's Church, Church Gresley is a Grade II* listed parish church in the Church of England in Church Gresley, Derbyshire.

History

The church dates from 1100 and incorporates the remains of the nave of a small Augustinian Priory, Gresley Priory.

The church was ruinous and restored in 1786. In 1872 a new chancel was added by Arthur Blomfield and all the seats were turned to face eastwards. In May 1932 the church was closed for 2 years because of the dangerous state of the ceiling. It re-opened in July 1934 after restoration. The church closed once again in 2018 due to falling masonry and structural issues with the roof.

Organ
 
The pipe organ was installed by Forster and Andrews in 1860. It was later modified by S Taylor in 1888, H Cantrill in 1960 and Henry Groves & Son in 2000. A specification of the organ can be found on the National Pipe Organ Register.

References

Church of England church buildings in Derbyshire
Grade II* listed churches in Derbyshire